Elections in West Bengal, a state in India are conducted in accordance with the Constitution of India. The Assembly of West Bengal creates laws regarding the conduct of local body elections unilaterally while any changes by the state legislature to the conduct of state level elections need to be approved by the Parliament of India. In addition, the state legislature may be dismissed by the Parliament according to Article 356 of the Indian Constitution and President's rule may be imposed.

Lok Sabha elections

 Results, post-1998, in text format . 
 1999 :  Total Seats : 42.  Left Front : 28 (CPM 21, CPI 3, RSP 3, AIFB 2), Trinamool (AITC) + BJP : (8+2) = 10, Congress 3 .
 2004 (14-th Lok Sabha) :  LF : 35/42 (CPM 26, CPI 3, RSP 3, Forward Block 3), [Congress 6 + AITC 1], BJP - zero. 
 2009 : AITC + Congress : 19+6 = 25/42, CPM 9, CPI 2, BJP - 1.
 2014 : AITC : 34/42, Congress : 4, BJP 2, CPM 2. 
 2019 : AITC : 22, BJP : 18, INC : 2, CPM - zero.

Assembly elections

References